The 1961 Buffalo Bills season was the team's second year in the American Football League. The Bills played in the Eastern division, winning six games, losing eight, and missing the postseason.

The Bills didn't have a winning record at any point in the season; they played their final five games of the season on the road.

Season summary
The Bills had a problematic quarterback situation, with former Redskin M.C. Reynolds, second-year Bills QB Johnny Green and ex-Lion Warren Rabb all struggling at the passer position. None completed more than 46% of their passes, and only Reynolds had a winning record (2–1) and threw for more than 1,000 yards.

Punter Billy Atkins led the league in punts, with 85; he also led the league with 44.5 yards per punt. Atkins also played safety for the Bills in 1961, and led the league with 10 interceptions, and was 2nd-Team All-AFL on defense.

Middle linebacker Archie Matsos was 1st-Team All-AFL for the second consecutive year, as was defensive tackle Chuck McMurtry. Defensive tackle LaVerne Torczon was 2nd-Team All-AFL in 1961.

Offseason

Personnel

Staff

Final roster

AFL draft

The Bills amassed a great deal of talent on their offensive line in the 1961 draft. Four of their first seven picks—Rice, Shaw, Barber and Bemiller, all offensive linemen—would go on to make at least one All-AFL team in the next five years. This draft would form the nucleus for the Bills' power running game over the next five years.

Rice was All-AFL as a rookie in 1961.

Standings

1961 Game-By-Game Results
The 1961 preseason was notable for the Bills as they became the only AFL (or NFL) team to lose to a CFL team, and it was the last game between the CFL and AFL/NFL met in history.

1961 Preseason

1961 Regular Season

Final roster

References

Buffalo Bills seasons
Buffalo Bills
Buffalo